Alexey Tsereteli (1864, Saint Petersburg, Russian Empire – 1942, Paris, France) was a Georgian prince and he was a Russian opera entrepreneur.
 Father: Akaki Tsereteli (1840–1915) was a Georgian prince, a prominent Georgian poet and national liberation movement figure.
 Mother: Russian Natalia Petrovna Bazilevskaya (ru: Наталия Петровна Базилевская).

Alexey was born in St. Petersburg and received the same education as all the Russian aristocracy and did not even know the Georgian language. He grew up a man of Russian culture.

From childhood he liked music and especially opera. He received the profession of engineer, but a passion for opera has won and he decided to open an opera troupe. In 1896/1897, Alexey Tsereteli opened an opera enterprise in Kharkov. Theater critic once noted the successful staging of the new company. Very soon, he continued to work in St. Petersburg and creates a New Opera (ru: «Новая опера») and, despite competition from the Mariinsky Theatre, his productions are popular. Worked there not only well-known Russian singers, but the famous European singers came. In 1905, Titta Ruffo came to participate in several performances. In 1907/08 A. Tsereteli organized tours of Feodor Chaliapin in America.

In 1917, A. Tsereteli left Russia. In 1921 he began to create an opera-ballet troupe in Barcelona, then - in Paris. In his company worked many famous Russian singer-emigrants. In 1926 he organized a performance of The Legend of the Invisible City of Kitezh and the Maiden Fevroniya at the Opéra national de Paris.

In 1929 he joined his company with a troupe of Russian opera of Maria Nikolaevna Kuznetsova and her husband Alfred Massenet (Jules Massenet's nephew). The new company was called the Russian Opera in Paris. The conductors, directors, painters, singers and ballet artists who worked there included Emil Cooper, Nikolai Evreinov, Alexander Sanin, Konstantin Korovin, Ivan Bilibin, Mstislav Dobuzhinsky; Michel Fokine, Bronislava Nijinska, opera singers: Feodor Chaliapin, Dmitriy Smirnov, Yelena Sadoven, Marya Davydova, Marianna Cherkasskaya, Natalia Ermolenko-Yuzhina, George Pozemkovskiy, Yakov Gorsky, Kapiton Zaporojets (Capiton D. Zaporozhetz, ru: Капитон Запорожец), Nina Koshetz etc. Alexey Tsereteli invited Colonel W. de Basil’s ballet troupe. The success was enormous.

The troupe was invited to different countries. In one of the productions of the opera Prince Igor in London in 1933 Feodor Chaliapin played two roles at once: Galitsky and Konchak (Russian sources call another date of this representation: June 5, 1931, Lyceum Theatre, London).

However, the owners of company quarreled and filed their claims in court, causing Private Company to eventually disband.  After this happened, Tsereteli tried to work with other partners, but failed to rebuild his success.

Before his death, Tsereteli bequeathed all the props of his troupe to the "theater of the future of a free Georgia". But his will was not recognized as valid and the property went to auction.

Prince Alexei Akakiyevich Tsereteli died in 1942 in German-occupied Paris.

References

1864 births
1942 deaths
Impresarios
Russian people of Georgian descent
Nobility of Georgia (country)